Peter Daniel O'Sullivan (22 May 1932 – 23 September 1972) was an Australian rules footballer who played with Essendon and North Melbourne in the Victorian Football League (VFL) during the 1950s.

Football
O'Sullivan, who was a good performer for Ascot Youth Centre in the Essendon District League before joining the VFL, played his football on the wing and as a half-forward flanker.

After making 12 appearances in his debut season with Essendon, O'Sullivan played 19 games in 1953, including a semi final.

Over the next two seasons O'Sullivan found in more difficult to establish a place for himself in the side.

In 1956 joined Charlie Gaudion's North Melbourne. He spent three years at North Melbourne, including the 1957 season in the reserves when North Melbourne 14.13 (97) defeated Fitzroy 13.15 (93) in the grand final—O'Sullivan, who kicked 4 goals, was best on the ground.

He finished his career in the Victorian Football Association at Coburg. In 1962 O'Sullivan coached Sorrento in the Mornington Peninsula Football League.

Death
At the age of 40, O'Sullivan, a passenger, was killed in a car accident on the Calder Highway, south of Ouyen, on 23 September 1972.

Notes

References
 Maplestone, M., Flying Higher: History of the Essendon Football Club 1872–1996, Essendon Football Club, (Melbourne), 1996.

External links
 
 
 Peter O'Sullivan at Boyles Football Photos.

1932 births
Essendon Football Club players
North Melbourne Football Club players
Coburg Football Club players
Australian rules footballers from Victoria (Australia)
Road incident deaths in Victoria (Australia)
1972 deaths